PPTN may refer to:

 Pedunculopontine tegmental nucleus, a part of the brainstem
 Pennsylvania Public Television Network, a Pennsylvania state agency that funded and supported Public television stations